Obrigado Brazil is a music album by Yo-Yo Ma.

In this context "obrigado" means "thank you" in Portuguese.

Track listing
 "Cristal" – 	02:49
 "Chega de Saudade" – 	04:16
 "A Lenda Do Caboclo" – 	03:10
 "Doce De Coco" – 	05:12
 "Dança Brasileira" – 	02:18
 "Apelo" – 	04:57
 "Dança Negra" – 	03:31
 "1 x 0 (Um a Zero)" – 	02:40
 "Menino" – 	05:36
 "Samambaia" – 	05:19
 "Carinhoso" – 	04:48
 "Alma Brasileira" – 	05:05
 "O Amor em Paz" – 	03:52
 "Bodas De Prata & Quatro Cantos" – 	09:48
 "Brasileirinho" – 	03:30
 "Salvador" – 	04:53

Track List:

 Cristal (Written by Cesar Camargo Mariano)
 Chega De Saudade (Written by Antonio Carlos Jobim)
 A Lenda Do Caboclo (Written by Heitor Villa-Lobos)
 Doce De Coco (Written by Jaco Do Bandolim)
 Dansa Brasileira (Written by Camargo Mazart Guarnieri)
 Apelo (Written by Baden Powell)
 Dansa Negra (Written by Camargo Mazart Guarnieri)
 I X O 'Um A Zero' (Written by Pixinguinha)
 Menino (Written by Sergio Assad)
 Samambaia (Written by Cesar Camargo Mariano)
 Carinhoso (Written by Pixinguinha)
 Alma Brasileira (Written by Heitor Villa-Lobos)
 O Amor Em Paz (Unknown)
 Bodas De Prata & Quatro Cantos (Written by Egberto Gismonti & G.E. Carneiro
 Brasileirinho (Written by Waldir Azevedo)
 Salvador (Written by Egberto Gismonti) Bonus Track

Personnel

Yo-Yo Ma  – Cello
Helio Alves  – Piano	
Odair Assad  – Guitar	
Sergio Assad  – Guitar, Arranger	
Cyro Baptista  – Percussion	
Paulinho Braga  – Drums	
Jose DaSilva  – Percussion	
Jose DeFaria  – Percussion	
Paquito D'Rivera  – Clarinet	
Egberto Gismonti  – Flute, Guitar, Piano, Arranger	
Romero Lubambo  – Guitar, Cavaquinho	
Cesar Camargo Mariano  – Piano
Nilson Matta  – Bass
Rosa Passos – Guitar, Vocals
Kathryn Stott  – Piano
Todd Whitelock  – Engineer

Production

Dominik Blech  – Engineer, Intern
Jorge Calandrelli  – Arranger, Producer
Stephen Danelian  – Photography
Ruth DeSarno  – A&R
Steven Epstein  – Producer
Michelle Errante  – Product Manager
Gil Gilbert  – Photography, Assistant
Phillip Huscher  – Liner Notes
Janush Kawa  – Photography
Richard King  – Engineer
Laura Kszan  – Editorial Director
Andreas Meyer  – Assistant Engineer, Technical Supervisor
Christopher Ottaunick  – Photography
Laraine Perri  – Executive Producer
Peta Scriba  – Assistant Engineer
Keith Shortreed  – Assistant Engineer
Roxanne Slimak  – Art Direction
Jason Spears  – Assistant Engineer
Jason Stasium  – Assistant Engineer

References

2003 albums